Rhenish (Rhenisch) is a newspaper format associated with the Rhineland. Rhenisch format pages measure around 350–360 mm by 510–530 mm (in either a horizontal or vertical orientation). A version of Rhenish around half the size is known as "half Rhenish" or "semi-Rhenish".

Newspaper formats